Maków  is a village in the administrative district of Gmina Skaryszew, within Radom County, Masovian Voivodeship, in east-central Poland.

The village has a population of 890.
A royal village, it was located in the second half of the 16th century in Radom County of Sandomierskie Voivodeship[6]. Between 1975 and 1998, the village administratively belonged to Radom Province.
In the village there is a historic manor house from the 18th century (now a school).

References

Villages in Radom County